Cohors [prima] Cretum [quingenaria peditata] sagittaria ("[1st infantry 500 strong] archer cohort of Cretans") was a Roman auxiliary archers regiment. The cohort was stationed in Dacia at castra Drobeta.

See also 
 List of Roman auxiliary regiments

References
 Academia Română: Istoria Românilor, Vol. 2, Daco-romani, romanici, alogeni, 2nd. Ed., București, 2010, 
 Cristian M. Vlădescu: Fortificațiile romane din Dacia Inferior, Craiova, 1986

Military of ancient Rome
Auxiliary peditata units of ancient Rome
Roman Dacia
Ancient Crete
Ancient Greek archers